Gu Xuesong (born June 21, 1993) is a Chinese competitive archer. He has won two medals, a gold in the men's team recurve and a bronze in the mixed team, in a major international tournament, spanning the Asian Games and the World Championships.

Gu rose to prominence in the world archery scene at the 2014 Asian Games in Incheon, South Korea. There, he and his teammates Yong Zhiwei and Qi Kaiyao powered past the Malaysian side in straight sets (6–0) to capture the men's team recurve title.

At the 2015 World Championships, Gu contributed to the Chinese trio's effort by finishing fifth and securing the full quota spot for Rio 2016. On that same season, he and his compatriots Yong and Xing Yu confidently knocked out the Canadians 6–0 towards their golden finish in the men's team recurve  at an Olympic test event in Rio de Janeiro.

Gu was selected to compete for the Chinese squad at the 2016 Summer Olympics in Rio de Janeiro, shooting in both individual and team recurve tournaments. First, he recorded 670 points out of a possible 720 to lead the Chinese threesome for the seventeenth seed heading to the knockout stage, along with an aggregate score of 1,997 produced by the trio in the classification round. Sitting at sixth in the men's team recurve, Gu, along with Xing and Wang Dapeng, scored an upset 6–0 victory over the defending champion Italy in the quarterfinals, before they dropped the semifinal match to the Americans with a 2–6. Attempting to retaliate on Australia for the podium lock, the Chinese trio could not edge their rivals out by a two-set deficit (2–6), but finished outside of medals in fourth instead. In the men's individual recurve, Gu lost the opening round match to Kazakhstan's Sultan Duzelbayev with a score of 4–6.

References

External links
 

Chinese male archers
Living people
Sportspeople from Shanghai
1993 births
Asian Games medalists in archery
Archers at the 2014 Asian Games
Olympic archers of China
Archers at the 2016 Summer Olympics
World Archery Championships medalists
Asian Games gold medalists for China
Medalists at the 2014 Asian Games